Diego Daniel Barreto Cáceres (born 16 July 1981) is a Paraguayan former professional footballer who played as a goalkeeper.

Diego is the brother of fellow Paraguayan footballer Édgar Barreto.

Career
Barreto started his career with the club Cerro Porteño, where he was trained by Modesto Sandoval and was teammates with Aldo Bobadilla. He developed in the youth divisions of Cerro.

Barreto was part of the silver medal-winning Paraguaya national team in the 2004 Olympics. Paraguay booked a quarter-final place with two victories in the qualifying group. The squad finished first, and then beat South Korea in the quarter-finals and Iraq in the semi-finals, before losing to Argentina in the final.

In 2007, Barreto had a spell with Newell's Old Boys in Argentina, but failed to break into the first team, returning to Paraguay in January 2008. However, he signed again for the Paraguayan team in July 2008.

He also holds an Italian passport.

In 2008, he spent a month with FC Locarno. He played in only one match, allowing four goals in the derby against FC Lugano. Barreto since returned to Cerro Porteño.

In July 2015 after not having his contract renewed Barreto moved to Cerro´s archrivals Club Olimpia.

International career
On 4 August, before the Summer Olympics began, he played in a preparation game against the Portugal of Cristiano Ronaldo in the city of Algarve, resulting in a 5–0 defeat.

Honours
Cerro Porteño
Paraguayan Primera División: 2004, 2005, 2012 Apertura

Paraguay U-23
Silver Medal at the Summer Olympics: 2004 Athens

See also
 Players and Records in Paraguayan Football

References

External links

Living people
1981 births
Association football goalkeepers
Paraguayan footballers
Paraguayan expatriate footballers
Paraguay under-20 international footballers
Paraguay international footballers
Paraguayan people of Italian descent
Olympic footballers of Paraguay
Olympic silver medalists for Paraguay
Footballers at the 2004 Summer Olympics
Paraguayan Primera División players
Cerro Porteño players
Newell's Old Boys footballers
UD Almería players
FC Locarno players
Club Sol de América footballers
Club Olimpia footballers
Sportivo Luqueño players
2004 Copa América players
2010 FIFA World Cup players
2011 Copa América players
Copa América Centenario players
Olympic medalists in football
Medalists at the 2004 Summer Olympics
Paraguayan expatriate sportspeople in Argentina
Paraguayan expatriate sportspeople in Spain
Paraguayan expatriate sportspeople in Switzerland
Expatriate footballers in Argentina
Expatriate footballers in Spain
Expatriate footballers in Switzerland